The Philippine Basketball Association's Rookie of the Year Award is an annual Philippine Basketball Association (PBA) award given to the top rookie(s) of the regular season.

The award is decided using criteria introduced for the 2011–12 season, which include accumulated statistical points, votes from media, players and the league's Commissioner's Office.

The most recent Rookie of the Year winner is Mikey Williams. Twelve winners were drafted first overall (the league started its draft in the  season). Six winners have also won the PBA Most Valuable Player (MVP) award in their careers; with Benjie Paras earning the honors the same season. Three winners have been elected to the PBA Hall of Fame.

Winners

Notes 

Rookie of the Year
Rookie player awards
Awards established in 1976
1976 establishments in the Philippines